Devil's Knot is a 2013 American biographical crime drama film directed by Atom Egoyan. Adapted from Mara Leveritt's 2002 book of the same name, the film is about the true story of three murdered children, and the three teenagers known as the West Memphis Three who were convicted of killing them, during the Satanic ritual abuse panic. The teenagers were subsequently sentenced to death (Echols) and life imprisonment (Baldwin and Misskelley), before all were released after eighteen years. Produced by Elizabeth Fowler, Richard Saperstein, Clark Peterson, Christopher Woodrow, and Paul Harris Boardman, the film stars Colin Firth, Reese Witherspoon, Dane DeHaan, Mireille Enos, Bruce Greenwood, Elias Koteas, Stephen Moyer, Alessandro Nivola, Amy Ryan, and Martin Henderson.

The film premiered at the 2013 Toronto International Film Festival on September 8. It had a limited release in Canadian theaters on January 24, 2014, and was released in U.S. theaters and video on demand services on May 9, 2014.

Plot
In 1993, in the working class, deeply religious community of West Memphis, Arkansas, three eight-year-old boys – Stevie Branch, Christopher Byers, and Michael Moore – go missing from their neighborhood. After an extensive search, their bound and beaten bodies are found the next day. The community and the police department are convinced that the murders are the work of a satanic cult, due to the violent and sexual natures of the crime. A month later, three teenagers – Damien Echols, Jason Baldwin, and Jessie Misskelley Jr. – are arrested after Misskelley confesses to the murders following 12 hours of interrogation. They are taken to trial, where Baldwin and Misskelley are sentenced to life in prison, and Echols to death, all the while proclaiming their innocence.

During the trial, the defense team's investigator, Ron Lax, uncovers evidence suggesting that the police mishandled and suppressed evidence in the case. This evidence includes blood evidence that was lost, a sighting of a never-identified man covered in blood and mud entering a restaurant near the site of the murders on the night the boys were killed, as well as a confession to the murders by a man named Chris Morgan, which may or may not have been coerced. The prosecution's two chief witnesses - a boy who claims in fantastic detail to have seen the murders and been forced to drink the victims' blood, and his mother, who claims to have heard Echolls confess - are found to be compromised. Meanwhile, Pam Hobbs, Stevie's mother, begins to suspect that her husband (and Stevie's stepfather) Terry killed the boy, especially after finding Stevie's prized Swiss Army knife in Terry's toolkit. Lax visits Pam, who expresses doubt about the verdict; Lax replies that, while he does not know who committed the murders, he knows in his heart that his clients are innocent. Soon afterward, Pam leaves her husband.

A series of title cards describe the aftermath of the trial: In August 2011, after nearly 20 years in prison, Echols, Baldwin and Misskelley were given a new trial and released after entering an Alford plea, under which they remain convicted felons; the boy and his mother, who testified against the defendants recanted; Lax discovered a hair sample from the crime scene that resembled Terry Hobbs' DNA; the wife of John Mark Byers, the father of one of the victims, was found dead under "unsolved" circumstances; and Pam Hobbs continued to look for the truth about her son's murder.

Cast

True story

Production
Colin Firth was confirmed to have joined the cast on May 21, 2012. More casting announcements were made on June 27, 2012.  The film was produced by Elizabeth Fowler, Richard Saperstein, Clark Peterson, Christopher Woodrow and Paul Harris Boardman, and the screenplay was written by Boardman and Scott Derrickson. The first image from the set was revealed on June 26, 2012.

Filming
Filming began on June 16, 2012 in Georgia, cities of Morrow and Atlanta. The courthouse scenes were filmed at the Bartow County Courthouse in Cartersville.

Release
The world premiere was held at the 2013 Toronto International Film Festival on September 8, 2013.  Image Entertainment purchased the distribution rights after its premiere.  The film was released in Canadian theaters (both English and French) on January 24, 2014.

Reception
Devil's Knot holds a 25% approval rating on the review aggregator website Rotten Tomatoes, based on 100 reviews, with an average rating of 4.7/10. The general consensus states: "Devil's Knot covers fact-based ground that's already been well-traveled with multiple (and far more compelling) documentaries." On Metacritic, the film has a 42/100 rating based on 24 critics, indicating "mixed or average reviews".

See also
These four documentaries center on the West Memphis Three:
 Paradise Lost: The Child Murders at Robin Hood Hills (1996)
 Paradise Lost 2: Revelations (2000)
 Paradise Lost 3: Purgatory (2011)
 West of Memphis (2012)

References

External links
 
 
 

2013 films
2013 biographical drama films
2013 crime drama films
2013 independent films
2010s legal drama films
American biographical drama films
American crime drama films
American independent films
American legal drama films
2010s English-language films
American courtroom films
Drama films based on actual events
Films about lawyers
Films about miscarriage of justice
American films based on actual events
Films based on non-fiction books
Films set in 1993
Films set in 1994
Films set in Arkansas
Films shot in Atlanta
Films shot in Georgia (U.S. state)
Crime films based on actual events
Worldview Entertainment films
Films directed by Atom Egoyan
Films scored by Mychael Danna
West Memphis Three
2010s American films